The Ulundi Local Municipality council consists of forty-seven members elected by mixed-member proportional representation. Twenty-four councillors are elected by first-past-the-post voting in twenty-four wards, while the remaining twenty-three are chosen from party lists so that the total number of party representatives is proportional to the number of votes received. In the election of 1 November 2021 the Inkatha Freedom Party (IFP) won a majority of thirty-two seats on the council.

Results 
The following table shows the composition of the council after past elections.

December 2000 election

The following table shows the results of the 2000 election.

March 2006 election

The following table shows the results of the 2006 election.

May 2011 election

The following table shows the results of the 2011 election.

August 2016 election

The following table shows the results of the 2016 election.

November 2021 election

The following table shows the results of the 2021 election.

References

Ulundi
Elections in KwaZulu-Natal
Zululand District Municipality